Prepops insitivus is a species of plant bug in the family Miridae. It is found in North America.

Subspecies
These two subspecies belong to the species Prepops insitivus:
 Prepops insitivus angusticollis (Knight, 1923)
 Prepops insitivus insitivus (Say, 1832)

References

Further reading

External links

 

Articles created by Qbugbot
Insects described in 1832
Restheniini